Gavin Hassett (born July 13, 1973 in Saint John, New Brunswick) is a Canadian rower. He began rowing in 1989. A three time Olympian, he won the silver medal at the 1996 Summer Olympics in the Men's Lightweight Coxless Fours event, alongside Jeffrey Lay, Dave Boyes and Brian Peaker. He also claimed a bronze medal at the 2002 World Rowing Championships in Seville, Spain in the same event. His international debut was in 1993 with a gold in the lightweight 8+ World champion in Roudnice, 1994 bronze, lucerne world cup regatta,  1994 4th Indianapolis lightweight 4- World championship, 1995 4th Tampere lightweight 4- World championship, 1996 silver lightweight 4- Atlanta Olympics, 1999 6th St Catharines lightweight 4- World championships, 2000 7th Sydney Olympic games, 2001 silver lightweight 4-  Munich world cup, 2001 5th Lucerne lightweight 4- World championships, 2002 gold Lucerne world cup lightweight 4-, 2002 bronze Seville world championships lightweight 4-, 2003 silver Lucerne worldcup regatta lightweight 4-, 2003 5th Milan lightweight 4- world championships, 2004 silver Lucerne worldcup regatta lightweight 4-, 2004 5th Athens lightweight 4- olympic games

References

1973 births
Living people
Sportspeople from Saint John, New Brunswick
Olympic rowers of Canada
Rowers at the 1996 Summer Olympics
Rowers at the 2000 Summer Olympics
Rowers at the 2004 Summer Olympics
Olympic silver medalists for Canada
Canadian male rowers
Olympic medalists in rowing
Medalists at the 1996 Summer Olympics